is the railway station in Isahaya, Nagasaki Prefecture, Japan. It is operated by JR Kyushu and is on the Nagasaki Main Line.

Lines
Only local trains run on this branch.

Station layout 
The station consists of a side platform serving a single track within a cutting. There is no station building, only a rudimentary shelter on the platform which houses an automatic ticket vending machine as well as a SUGOCA card reader.

Adjacent stations

History
Japanese National Railways (JNR) opened Higashisono Signal Box on 1 October 1961 as an additional facility on the existing track of the Nagasaki Main Line. It was upgraded to a passenger station on 1 October 1966. The section serving Higashisono which ran from Kikitsu through Nagayo to Urakami became known as the old line or the Nagayo branch. With the privatization of JNR on 1 April 1987, control of the station passed to JR Kyushu.

Passenger statistics
In fiscal 2014, there were a total of 26,713 boarding passengers, giving a daily average of 73 passengers.

Environs
Isahaya City Hall Tarami Branch Ōkusa Office
Route 207
Ōmura Bay

See also
 List of railway stations in Japan

References

External links
Higashisono Station (JR Kyushu)

Railway stations in Nagasaki Prefecture
Nagasaki Main Line
Railway stations in Japan opened in 1966